The University of Missouri (Mizzou, MU, or Missouri) is a public land-grant research university in Columbia, Missouri. It is Missouri's largest university and the flagship of the four-campus University of Missouri System. MU was founded in 1839 and was the first public university west of the Mississippi River. It has been a member of the Association of American Universities since 1908 and is classified among "R1: Doctoral Universities – Very high research activity". University of Missouri alumni, faculty, and staff include 18 Rhodes Scholars, 19 Truman Scholars, 141 Fulbright Scholars, 7 Governors of Missouri, and 6 members of the U.S. Congress. Two alumni and faculty have been awarded the Nobel Prize: alumnus Frederick Chapman Robbins won the Nobel Prize in Physiology or Medicine in 1954 and George Smith (chemist) was awarded the Nobel Prize in Chemistry in 2018 while affiliated with the university.

Enrolling 31,401 students in 2021, it offers more than 300 degree programs in thirteen major academic divisions. Its Missouri School of Journalism was founded by Walter Williams in 1908 as the world's first journalism school; it publishes a daily newspaper, the Columbia Missourian, and operates NBC affiliate KOMU. The University of Missouri Research Reactor Center is the United States’ sole source of isotopes used in nuclear medicine. The university operates University of Missouri Health Care, running a number of hospitals and clinics in Mid-Missouri.

Its NCAA Division I athletic teams are known as the Missouri Tigers, and compete in the Southeastern Conference. The American tradition of homecoming is claimed to have originated at Missouri.

The campus is home to the State Historical Society of Missouri, and the Museum of Art and Archaeology. Its historic center, Francis Quadrangle, is a National Historic District. Jesse Hall and the Missouri Theatre are large performance venues and utilized by the University of Missouri School of Music.

History

Early years
In 1839, the Missouri Legislature passed the Geyer Act to establish funds for a state university. It was the first public university west of the Mississippi River. To secure the university, the citizens of Columbia and Boone County pledged $117,921 in cash and land to beat out five other central Missouri counties for the location of the state university. The land on which the university was constructed was just south of Columbia's downtown and owned by James S. Rollins who was later called the "Father of the University." As the first public university in the Louisiana Purchase, the school was shaped by Thomas Jefferson's ideas about public education. The school initially admitted only white male students.

In 1862, the American Civil War forced the university to close for much of the year. Residents of Columbia formed a Union "home guard" militia that became known as the "Fighting Tigers of Columbia". They were given the name for their readiness to protect the city and university. In 1890, the university's newly formed football team took the name the "Tigers" after the Civil War militia.

In 1870, the institution was granted land-grant college status under the Morrill Act of 1862. The act led to the founding of the Missouri School of Mines and Metallurgy as an offshoot of the main campus in Columbia. It developed as the present-day Missouri University of Science and Technology. In 1888, the Missouri Agricultural Experiment Station opened. This grew to encompass ten centers and research farms around Missouri. By 1890, the university encompassed a normal college (for training of teachers of students through high school), engineering college, arts and science college, school of agriculture and mechanical arts. school of medicine, and school of law.

1892–present

On January 9, 1892, Academic Hall, the institution's central administrative building, burned in a fire that gutted the building, leaving little more standing than six stone Ionic columns. Under the administration of Missouri Governor David R. Francis, the university was rebuilt, with additions that shaped the modern institution.

After the fire, some state residents tried to have the university moved further west to Sedalia; but Columbia rallied support to keep it. The columns were retained as a symbol of the historic campus. Today they are surrounded by the Francis Quadrangle, the oldest part of campus. At the quad's southern end is Academic Hall's replacement, Jesse Hall, named for Richard Jesse (the president of the university at the time of the fire). Built in 1895, Jesse Hall holds many administrative offices and Jesse Auditorium. The buildings surrounding the quad were constructed of red brick, leading to this area becoming known as Red Campus. The area was tied together in planned landscaping and walks in 1910 by George Kessler in a City Beautiful design of the grounds. Jesse Hall got $9.8 mil. makeover that includes a fire sprinkler system, work on its elevators, and a new heating and cooling system as part of a $92 mil. total renovation package the Curators of the University of Missouri approved in June 2013. This upgrade was completed in May 2015.

To the east of the quadrangle, later buildings constructed of white limestone in 1913 and 1914 to accommodate the new academic programs became known as the White Campus. In 1908 the world's first journalism school opened at MU. It became notable for its "Missouri Method" of hands-on, experience-based instruction. It later established an award for "Distinguished Journalism".

In April 1923, a black janitor was accused of the rape of the daughter of a University of Missouri professor. James T. Scott was abducted from the Boone County Jail by a lynch mob of townsfolk and students, and was hanged from a bridge near the campus.

One of the students, Lloyd L. Gaines, brought his case to the United States Supreme Court. On December 12, 1938, in a landmark 6–2 decision, the court ordered the State of Missouri to admit Gaines to MU's law school or provide a facility of equal stature. Gaines disappeared in Chicago on March 19, 1939, under suspicious circumstances. The university granted Gaines a posthumous honorary law degree in May 2006. Undergraduate divisions were integrated by court order in 1950, when the university was compelled to admit African Americans to courses that were not offered at Lincoln University.

On June 5, 1935, the university erected a memorial to the Confederate soldiers of Missouri; it was popularly known as Confederate Rock. The monument was removed in 1974.

After World War II, the enrollment at universities around the country grew at an extraordinary pace, and MU was no exception. This was due in part to the G.I. Bill, which allowed veterans to attend college with the assistance of the federal government.

Following the 2015–16 University of Missouri protests, the chancellor and system president resigned amid racial complaints by students.

Campus

The campus of the University of Missouri is  just south of Downtown Columbia and is maintained as a botanical garden. The historical campus is centered on Francis Quadrangle, a historic district listed on the National Register of Historic Places, and contains a number of buildings on the National Register of Historic Places.

The academic buildings are classified into two main groups: Red Campus and White Campus. Red Campus is the historic core of mostly brick academic buildings around the landmark columns of the Francis Quadrangle; it includes Jesse Hall and Switzler Hall. In the early 20th century, the College of Agriculture began a period of rapid expansion in which several buildings were constructed to accommodate the growing program and student body. The new buildings, constructed in Neo-Gothic style from native Missouri limestone, form the White Campus. Its most notable building is Memorial Union.

During the 1990s, Red Campus was extended to the south with the creation of the Carnahan Quadrangle. Hulston Hall of the University of Missouri School of Law, completed in 1988, formed the eastern border of the future quad. The Reynolds Alumni Center was completed in 1992 on the west side of the new quad. It was completed in 2002 with Cornell Hall of the Trulaske College of Business and Tiger Plaza. Plans for a new plaza on the north end of the Carnahan Quadrangle were unveiled in 2014. Called Traditions Plaza, it was opened on October 25, 2014, during homecoming festivities.

While the original MU intercollegiate athletic facilities, such as Rollins Field and Rothwell Gymnasium, were just south of the academic buildings, later expanded facilities were constructed across Stadium Boulevard, where Memorial Stadium opened in 1926. The Hearnes Center was built to the east of the stadium in 1972. In 1994, the university developed the first draft of a master plan for the campus to tie together all of Tiger athletic facilities to the south of Stadium Boulevard and add to its design. Today, the MU Sports Park includes the Mizzou Arena, Taylor Stadium, Walton Stadium, Mizzou Athletics Training Complex, University Field and Devine Pavilion. Student athletic facilities remain in the core area of campus. Rothwell Gymnasium and Brewer Fieldhouse are part of the  Student Recreation Center, which was ranked number one in the nation in 2005 by Sports Illustrated.

The main campus of the University of Missouri Hospitals and Clinics is north of the sports complex. It includes the University of Missouri Hospital and Truman Memorial Veterans Hospital. Two of the hospitals, Columbia Regional Hospital and Ellis Fischel Cancer Center, are northeast of the main campus near I-70.

To the south of the MU Sports Park is the MU Research Park. It includes the University of Missouri Research Reactor Center, International Institute for Nano and Molecular Medicine, MU Life Science Business Incubator at Monsanto Place, and Dalton Cardiovascular Research Center. In 2005, the University of Missouri Board of Curators approved legislation to designate the South Farm of the College of Agriculture, Food and Natural Resources (CAFNR) as a research park. Tenants at Discovery Ridge include ABC Laboratories and the MU Research Animal Diagnostic Laboratory.

The main campus is flanked to the east and west by Greek Life housing. The University of Missouri has nearly 50 national social fraternities and sororities, many of which occupy historical residences now valued in the millions of dollars. Beta Sigma Psi, Kappa Alpha Order, Sigma Chi, Beta Theta Pi (Originally Zeta Phi), Alpha Gamma Rho, Tau Kappa Epsilon and Sigma Nu form a Greek Row (also called Frat Row) along College Avenue in the East Campus area. Delta Tau Delta, Kappa Sigma, Lambda Chi Alpha, and Sigma Alpha Epsilon are in the West Campus area along Stewart Street, which leads directly into the Francis Quadrangle. Most of the Greek-letter organizations are in a Greek Town, with approximately 30 Greek residences, to the north of Memorial Stadium.

The main campus, along with all other MU-owned or operated facilities, is protected by the University of Missouri Police Department, which is in the Virginia Avenue parking garage on the main campus. In 2019 a new Center for Missouri Studies was opened as a new headquarters for the State Historical Society of Missouri. It contains a vastly expanded gallery/collection display area, a library/reading room, classrooms, offices, open and closed stacks, microfilm rooms, art restoration lab, a large event room, and a gift shop. In 2020 a new home for the School of Music was finished, the Sinquefield Music Center. The building houses faculty offices, classrooms, two large ensemble rehearsal spaces, a recording studio, many small rehearsal rooms. As of 2020 the NextGen Precision Health Institute was under construction on the University of Missouri Health campus. This five-story 265,000 square-foot building will provide state-of-the-art medical research space.

Academics and rankings

MU is the largest public university in Missouri. Of those applying for freshman admission, 78.1% are admitted with those matriculating having an average GPA of 3.6, an average SAT composite score of 1232 out of a maximum of 1600, and an average ACT composite score of 26 out of a maximum of 36.

MU is a member of the Association of American Universities and classified among "R1: Doctoral Universities – Very high research activity".According to the National Science Foundation, MU spent $388 million on research and development in 2021, ranking it 71st in the nation. MU is also one of two land-grant universities in the state, along with Lincoln University.

In 1908, the Missouri School of Journalism (colloquially the "J-school") was founded in Columbia; it claims to be the first of its kind in the world although the French had first established their Ecole Supérieure de Journalisme de Paris in 1899.

The UM System owns and operates KOMU-TV, the NBC/CW affiliate for Columbia and nearby Jefferson City. It is a full-fledged commercial station and a working lab for journalism students. The MU School of Journalism publishes the Columbia Missourian and Vox Magazine, where students learn reporting, editing and design in a newsroom managed by professional editors. It operates the local National Public Radio Station KBIA and produces Radio Adelante, a Spanish-language radio program.

Founded in 1978 after 23 years as a unit of the School of Medicine, the School of Health Professions became an autonomous division in December 2000. The school's five departments and eight accredited academic programs have a long history, some dating to the early 20th century. It is Missouri's only state-supported school of health professions on a campus with an academic health center, and the only allied health school in the UM system.

The university maintains the largest library collection in the State of Missouri. As of the 2011–12 academic year, the collection held 3.1 million volumes, 8.1 million microforms, 678,596 e-books, almost 1.7 million government documents, more than 284,000 print maps, and more than 53,000 journal subscriptions. The collection is housed in Ellis Library, the University Archives, and seven other specialized academic libraries across campus. Most of the original collection, housed in Academic Hall, was lost in the 1892 fire.

During the American Civil War, Union troops used the Library in Academic Hall as a guard room. The Union troops caused significant damage, including taking 467 volumes to build fires. The Board of Curators later sued the US Army for the destruction on campus. Settled in 1915, the suit's award was used to build the Memorial Gateway on the northern edge of Red Campus.

In 1913, construction began on a new main library, completed in 1915. It was expanded in 1935, 1958, and 1985. It was dedicated as Elmer Ellis Library on October 10, 1972, in honor of the thirteenth president of the University of Missouri. Today, the MU libraries are home to the 47th largest research collection in North America.

The Jeffrey E. Smith Institute of Real Estate was founded in 2005 by a donation from alumnus Jeffrey Smith to meet the growing interest of students in the College of Business, seeking to learn more about the real estate industry.

MU merged two departments, the Center for Distance and Independent Study and MU Direct: Continuing and Distance Education, to form Mizzou Online in 2011. Mizzou Online offers online courses for 18 of the university's colleges and operates the University of Missouri High School, a distance learning K-12 high school.

, the University of Missouri Research Reactor Center is the highest power university research reactor in the U.S. at 10 megawatt (10 million watts) thermal output.

Organization and administration

The University of Missouri is organized into seven colleges, eleven schools and hosts approximately 300 majors.

Name
Upon creation of the system, each university was renamed with its host city; thus, the university in Columbia became the University of Missouri–Columbia. In the proceeding decades, colloquial and verbal usage of the generic name in reference to MU continued. There were attempts to drop Columbia from its name by students, faculty, alumni, and administrators who felt it might cause the university to be perceived as a regional institution. This change was long resisted by the UM System and the other universities on the basis of uniformity and fairness. However, after a renewed effort for "name restoration", the Board of Curators voted unanimously on November 29, 2007, to allow MU to drop Columbia from its name for all public use. Continued use of the name University of Missouri–Columbia is not incorrect but is being phased out by MU, except as required on official internal documents within the UM System. Its use also continues to be advocated by some faculty, administration, and alumni of UMKC, UMSL, and Missouri S&T.

Presidents and chancellors
Each campus of the University of Missouri System is led by a chancellor, who reports to the president of the UM System. Prior to the formation of the system in 1963, the Columbia campus and its offshoot in Rolla were led directly by the president and the position of chancellor did not exist. The below contains a list of presidents from 1963–present but does not include interim presidents or chancellors. John Lathrop is the only president or chancellor to have served nonconsecutive terms.

Presidents, 1841–63 and Chancellors, 1963–present
 John Hiram Lathrop (1841–49)
 James Shannon (1850–56)
 William Wilson Hudson (1856–59)
 Benjamin Blake Minor (1860–62)
 John Hiram Lathrop (1865–66)
 Daniel Read (1866–76)
 Samuel Spahr Laws (1876–89)
 Richard Henry Jesse (1891–1908)
 Albert Ross Hill (1908–21)
 John Carleton Jones (1922–23)
 Stratton Brooks (1923–30)
 Walter Williams (1931–35)
 Frederick Middlebush (1935–54)
 Elmer Ellis† (1955–63)
 John W. Schwada (1964–70)
 Herbert W. Schooling (1971–78)
 Barbara Uehling (1978–87)
 Haskell Monroe (1987–93)
 Charles Kiesler (1993–96)
 Richard L. Wallace (1997–2004)
 Brady J. Deaton (2004–13)
Stephen J. Owen (interim, November 2013 - February 2014)
 R. Bowen Loftin (2014–15)
 Hank Foley (interim, 2015–May 3, 2017)
 Garnett S. Stokes (interim, May 4, 2017 – August 1, 2017)
 Alexander Cartwright (August 1, 2017 – March 20, 2020)
 Mun Choi†† (2020–present)

† Ellis became president of the University of Missouri System upon its creation, serving until 1966.

†† Choi is the first Chancellor to simultaneously be President of the University of Missouri System

Student life

Residential life
The University of Missouri operates 23 on-campus residence halls and least two other off-campus sites. The two off-campus locations include: Tiger Diggs at Campus View Apartments and True Scholars House. Many residence halls on campus offer learning communities and freshman interest groups. Both programs seek to ensure students succeed academically while living in the residence halls.

Three of the older halls: Jones, Lathrop, and Laws are scheduled to be torn down and replaced as the largest and first part ($71 million) of a $92 million campus improvement project approved by the Board of Curators on June 13, 2013. The plan also includes replacing the dining hall north of Faurot Field. The three halls presently can house up to 1,010 students. The new halls will expand the capacity to 1,242 by the time the first part is completed in May 2017. The renovation of Swallow Hall (1893) is also part of the plan, costing $11.5 million of the total.

Two residence halls, Excellence and Respect will be on standby starting in the Fall 2016 semester, and only used if necessary because Fall enrollment is expected to drop by 1,500 students, which it did by 2,273 including 1,412 fewer freshmen. The 319 beds will be used over the summer until August 4, 2016. Both halls will undergo repairs if not needed. The new George C. Brooks Hall will open as planned for the Fall 2016 semester and house 293 students.

Three more residence halls will temporarily close in the Fall of 2017: Center, Responsibility, and Discovery. Previously it was announced Respect, Excellence, Schurz and McDavid wouldn't operate in the Fall unless there was sufficient demand to reopen some of them. Combined, the seven halls are capable of housing about 1,500 students. The closures are estimated to save about $2 million, largely through reduced utility costs. The university says two of the closed halls also could get some use as guest and conference housing. The temporary closures come after freshman enrollment dropped 24 percent for this academic year. The declining enrollment precipitated a budget plan to cut 400 jobs, but most of them are from those resigning or retiring, so less than 100 actual jobs will be eliminated for the 2018 fiscal year.

Southwest Village 
Residence Halls:
 North Hall (2006)
 Center Hall (2006, on standby Fall 2017))
 South Hall (2006)
 Bluford Hall (2017)
 George C. Brooks Hall (Fall 2016)
Dining Halls:
 Restaurants at Southwest (2017)
Convenience Store:
 Mizzou Market: Southwest

Pershing/Mid-Campus Area
Residence Halls:
 Defoe-Graham Hall (1939–47 & 2009)
 Galena Hall (2009)
 Dogwood Hall (2009)
 Hawthorn Hall (2009)
Dining Hall:
 Plaza 900
Convenience Store:
 Mizzou Market: Hitt Street

College Avenue Area
Residence Halls:
 Discovery Hall (2004, on standby Fall 2017)
 Excellence Hall (2004, on standby Fall 2016)
 Responsibility Hall (2004, on standby Fall 2017)
 Respect Hall (2004, on standby Fall 2016)
 Hatch Hall (1962–2007)
 Schurz Hall (1962–2007, on standby Fall 2017)
 College Avenue Hall (2006)
 Gateway Hall (2015)
Dining Halls:
 Plaza 900 (2004, expanded in 2014)
 Baja Grill (2008)

Rollins Area
Residence Halls:
 Gillett Hall (1965–2011)
 Hudson Hall (1965–2010)
 Johnston Hall (1947–2013)
 Wolpers Hall (1963–2014)
Dining Halls:
 Rollins
 Sabai (2011)
 Plaza 900 (2004)
 Mizzou Market: Student Center (2011)

Mark Twain Area
Residence Halls:
 Mark Twain Hall (1964–2013)
 McDavid Hall (1956–2007)
Dining Halls:
 The MARK on 5th Street  (2013)

Groups and activities
Tap Day is an annual spring ceremony in which the identities of the members of the six secret honor societies are revealed. The participating societies are QEBH, Mystical Seven, LSV, Omicron Delta Kappa, Mortar Board, and the Rollins Society. The ceremony, first held in 1927, takes place at the columns on Francis Quadrangle.

The Associated Students of the University of Missouri (ASUM) is a student-run lobbying organization that represents the students' interests in the state and national capitals. ASUM's platform has included issues such as equalizing the "Access Missouri" grant, expanding "Bright Flight" funding, and giving students a vote on the Board of Curators.

The Trulaske Consulting Association was started in 2009. It is a relatively new student organization and is open to students of all departments. However, most members are MBA and undergrad business students. The association aims to increase awareness, provide exposure, and facilitate networking between students and professionals in the consulting industry. The growing popularity of the association has been attributed to the resources available to student members. Workshops by management consultants and case studies on strategy form an integral part of the activities organised by TCA.

The Muslim Student Organisation (MSO) provides an inclusive, inviting educational and social environment for the Muslims at the University of Missouri-Columbia; and works to create bridges between Muslims and other groups in the Columbia community. The Muslim Student Organisation engages in religious, educational, and social activities that aim to increase unity on campus and awareness of Islam among Muslims and people of other faiths. The Organization aspires to promote a healthy understanding of Islam in the context of social and cultural settings. MSO membership is open to all students at MU.

Rabbi Avraham Lapine of Chabad provides a wide range of services to students, including teaching courses at The Rohr Jewish Learning Institute's Sinai Scholars, which allows students to explore the modern significance of the Ten Commandments.

Greek life
MU is home to one of the oldest and largest Greek systems in the nation . Founded in 1869, the Greek Community represents 22% of the student population. More than 70 Greek-letter organizations are active at MU.

Athletics

The Missouri Tigers are a member of the Southeastern Conference with the exception of wrestling, which competes in the Big 12 Conference. Mizzou is the only school in the state with all of its sports in the NCAA Division I and a football team that competes in the NCAA Division I Football Bowl Subdivision (FBS). These are the highest levels of college sports in the United States. The official colors are black and gold.

Athletic sports for the Tigers include men's and women's basketball, baseball, cross country, football, golf, gymnastics, swimming & diving, softball, track, tennis, volleyball, women's soccer, and wrestling. Historic sports included a shooting club, in which the ladies' team in 1934 won a national championship. Former football coach Gary Pinkel holds the record at the university for the most wins on the gridiron. Additionally, former basketball coach and alum Norm Stewart maintains the record for the most wins on the hardcourt.

MU football games are played on Faurot Field at Memorial Stadium ("The Zou"). Men's and women's basketball games take place at the Mizzou Arena, just south of the football stadium. The Hearnes Center had hosted men's and women's basketball from 1972 to 2004 and it is still used for other athletic (including wrestling, volleyball, and indoor track and field) and school events.

The Missouri Tiger men's basketball team has had 22 NCAA Tournament appearances, the second-most Tournament appearances without a Final Four. The Tigers have appeared in the regional finals (Elite Eight) of the NCAA Tournament six times (twice under coach Norm Stewart, Missouri head coach from 1967 to 1999). The Tigers have won 15 conference championships, beginning with the Missouri Valley Conference, followed by the Big Six, the Big Eight, and the Big 12 Conference. In 1994, the Tigers went undefeated in the Big Eight to take the regular season title. In 2009, Missouri won its first Big 12 Championship over Baylor. Missouri went on to win its second Big 12 Championship in its final season in the Big 12 in 2012, once again defeating Baylor. Standout players from the Mizzou's basketball team include, Anthony Peeler, John Brown, Jon Sundvold, Steve Stipanovich, Kareem Rush, Keyon Dooling Doug Smith, Willie Smith, Norm Stewart, Linas Kleiza, Derrick Chievous, DeMarre Carroll, Kim English. Jordan Clarkson and Marcus Denmon.

The official mascot for Missouri Tigers athletics is Truman the Tiger, created on September 16, 1986. Following a campus-wide contest, Truman was named in honor of Harry S. Truman, the only U.S. president from Missouri. Today, Truman appears to cheer on the team, mingle with supporters at Mizzou athletic events as well as at pep-rallies, alumni association functions, and frequent visits to Columbia-area schools.

On November 24, 2007, the Mizzou football team played against its biggest rival, Kansas, at Arrowhead Stadium in Kansas City, Missouri. At that time, KU was ranked No. 2 and MU was ranked No. 3 nationally. At the end of the game, Mizzou defeated KU, 36–28. The following day MU was ranked No. 1 in the country for the second time in its history.
On December 1, 2007, the Mizzou football team lost the Big 12 Championship game in San Antonio, Texas, to Oklahoma 38–17, falling out of national title and Bowl Championship Series contention. The team regrouped and played in the Cotton Bowl January 1, 2008, at Dallas, Texas, defeating Arkansas, 38–7. In the final Associated Press "Top 25 football poll" of the 2007 season, Mizzou was ranked No. 4 in the country, its highest finishing position in the team's history.

On November 6, 2011, the University of Missouri announced it would leave the Big 12 Conference to join the Southeastern Conference effective July 1, 2012. In September 2012, the school's wrestling team became an associate member of the Mid-American Conference, as the SEC does not sponsor wrestling.

On December 7, 2013, Mizzou played in the SEC Championship Game in Atlanta in the Georgia Dome against Auburn. The teams were ranked 5th and 3rd, respectively in the nation. Mizzou fell to the eventual national runners-up 59–42, and ended up playing in the 2014 Cotton Bowl Classic at AT&T Stadium in Arlington, Texas. Missouri (#9) defeated Oklahoma State (#13) 41–31, winning their second Cotton Bowl Classic.

On December 6, 2014, #17 Mizzou played #1 Alabama in its second consecutive SEC Championship Game falling to the Crimson Tide, 42–13. Mizzou went on to play Minnesota in the Citrus Bowl, winning 33-17 and finishing #16 in the nation.

Traditions

Tiger Walk and Prowl
The Tiger Walk is held annually before the fall semester in the Quad, as welcome and orientation for new students to the university. Students can meet and also learn about school organizations, which have stations around the Quad. After hearing of the four pillars of success, students walk in procession through the quad and the Columns toward Jesse Hall, symbolizing their entrance into the university. Tiger Prowl is held for graduation seniors on the Quad. They walk through the columns, away from Jesse Hall, to symbolize becoming alumni. Refreshments, such as famous tiger stripe ice cream, are provided after the ceremony.

Homecoming
In 1911, athletic director Chester Brewer invited alumni to "come home" for the big football game against the University of Kansas. A spirit rally and parade were planned as part of the celebration. The Council for Advancement and Support of Education has called MU's homecoming celebration the best in the nation and a model program . Missouri Homecoming also includes several service elements, and the homecoming blood drive has earned the Guinness Record as the nation's largest.

Undergraduate tuition
The annual tuition for in-state residents for 2016–17 is $9,518 and $25,892 for out-of-state residents, plus $10,298 for room and board on campus with that total not counting books and supplies ($1,344) or transportation ($4,756) expenses. A 1.7% undergraduate increase in tuition and fees was previously approved in the 2014 operating budget by the Board of Curators in June 2013, which also approved salary increases of 1.5% to 3% for the faculty.

Notable faculty and alumni

In the Spring of 2016, there are 300,315 living alumni worldwide. 274,447 reside in the United States, 156,585 in Missouri, 61,346 in the St. Louis area, 30,018 in the Kansas City area, and 2,718 outside the U.S. Other notable alumni include: William Worrall Mayo, the founder of Mayo Clinic, Peggy Cherng, co-founder of Panda Express, Edward D. "Ted" Jones, Managing Partner of Edward Jones Investments, and Rodger O. Riney, founder of Scotttrade.

See also
 KBIA
 KCOU
 Missouri Scholars Academy

Notes

References

Bibliography

Viles, Jonas The University of Missouri, 1839–1939, E.W. Stephens Publishing Company

External links

 
 University of Missouri Athletics website
 
 
 

 
Land-grant universities and colleges
Educational institutions established in 1839
1839 establishments in Missouri
Universities and colleges in Columbia, Missouri
Schools of public health in the United States
Forestry education
Flagship universities in the United States
University of Missouri